Airport '77 is a 1977 American air disaster film, and the third installment of the Airport film series. The film stars an ensemble cast of veteran actors including Jack Lemmon, James Stewart, Joseph Cotten, Olivia de Havilland, and Brenda Vaccaro as well as the return of George Kennedy from the two previous Airport  films. It is directed by Jerry Jameson, produced by William Frye, executive produced by Jennings Lang with a screenplay by Michael Scheff and David Spector.

The plot concerns a private Boeing 747 packed with VIPs and priceless art that is hijacked before crashing into the ocean in the Bermuda Triangle, prompting the survivors to undertake a desperate struggle for survival.

Despite mixed critical reviews, Airport '77 was a box-office hit grossing $91 million worldwide. It was nominated for two Academy Awards.

Plot
Wealthy philanthropist Philip Stevens is having invited guests flown in his luxurious privately-owned Boeing 747-100, Stevens's Flight 23, to his Palm Beach, Florida estate. Aboard are his estranged adult daughter and her young son. Priceless artwork from Stevens's private collection destined for his new museum is also on the jetliner. The collection has motivated a group of thieves led by co-pilot Bob Chambers to hijack the aircraft.

Mid-flight, Captain Don Gallagher is lured from the cockpit and rendered unconscious. A sleeping gas secretly installed pre-flight is released into the cabin, knocking out unprotected crew and passengers. Chambers, flying to a small deserted island to offload the art treasures, drops the plane below radar range causing Stevens' Flight 23 to "disappear" in the Bermuda Triangle. Descending to virtual wave-top altitude, Flight 23 heads into a fog bank, reducing visibility. Minutes later, a large offshore drilling platform emerges from the haze, and Flight 23 is headed straight for it.

Chambers attempts to avert a collision, but the wing clips the structure's tower, igniting an engine. Chambers extinguishes the fire but a sudden loss of airspeed threatens to stall the airplane. As he struggles to maintain control, the passengers begin waking up to the unfolding disaster. Chambers is unable to maintain his airspeed; the plane stalls and crashes into the water, floating momentarily before quietly slipping below the surface.

The plane settles in relatively shallow water that is above the plane's crush depth, though water pressure gradually compromises the fuselage. Many passengers are injured, some seriously. Chambers, the only surviving hijacker, reveals the plane is two hundred miles off course, meaning search and rescue efforts will be focused in the wrong area. As a search for the missing plane is launched, veteran aeronautics expert Joe Patroni joins the rescue operation as a technical adviser, joined by the jet's owner, Philip Stevens. Meanwhile, the trapped crew can only contact rescuers by getting a signal buoy to the surface. Captain Gallagher and a professional diver and passenger, Martin Wallace, enter the main cargo preparing to swim to the surface using air masks. The hatch suddenly blows open, killing Wallace. Gallagher barely makes it to the surface and activates the emergency beacon. The signal is detected and a  rescue operation is launched. Meanwhile, the plane's fuselage is steadily leaking.

The Navy dispatches a sub-recovery ship, the USS Cayuga, the destroyer USS Agerholm, and a flotilla of other vessels to the crash site, rescuing Gallagher. Guided by Gallagher, Navy divers rig the plane with balloons and inflate them, slowly raising the aircraft, which could split apart. Just before the plane reaches the surface, a balloon breaks loose and pressure is reduced to stabilize the aircraft. A cargo hold door inside the plane bursts open and seawater swamps the cabin; Chambers, pinned under a sofa, drowns. Emily’s injured friend Dorothy dies from her injuries, Wallace's widow, Karen and a stewardess drown. With time running out, air pressure is increased, raising the plane to the surface. All survivors are quickly evacuated. Captain Gallagher and Stevens's assistant, Eve, get trapped inside and escape through the upper deck. All buoyancy is lost and the 747 slips under the waves for the last time. The survivors are unloaded on a nearby rescue ship.

Cast

 Jack Lemmon as Capt. Don Gallagher
 Lee Grant as Karen Wallace
 Brenda Vaccaro as Eve Clayton
 Joseph Cotten as Nicholas St. Downs III
 Olivia de Havilland as Emily Livingston
 James Stewart as Philip Stevens
 George Kennedy as Joseph "Joe" Patroni
 Darren McGavin as Stan Buchek
 Christopher Lee as Martin Wallace
 Robert Foxworth as Bob Chambers
 Robert Hooks as Eddie
 Monte Markham as Banker
 Kathleen Quinlan as Julie
 Gil Gerard as Frank Powers
 James Booth as Ralph Crawford
 Monica Lewis as Anne
 Maidie Norman as Dorothy
 Pamela Bellwood as Lisa Stevens
 Arlene Golonka as Mrs. Jane Stern
 Tom Sullivan as Steve
 M. Emmet Walsh as Dr. Williams
 Michael Pataki as Wilson
 George Furth as Gerald Lucas
 Richard Venture as Commander Guay
 Elizabeth Cheshire as Bonnie Stern 
 Anthony Battaglia as Benjy

Production note

Although the disaster portrayed in the film is fictional, rescue operations depicted in the movie are actual rescue operations utilized by the Navy in the event of similar emergencies or disasters, as indicated at the end of the film prior to the closing credits.

For its initial broadcast on NBC-TV in September 1978, an additional 70 minutes of outtakes and new footage shot especially for network TV was added.

Reception

Critical reception
Rotten Tomatoes, a review aggregator, reports that 40% of 10 surveyed critics gave the film a positive review; the average rating is 5.4/10. On Metacritic the film has a weighted average score of 36 out of 100, based on 7 critics, indicating "generally unfavorable reviews". Variety wrote, "The story's formula banality is credible most of the time and there's some good actual US Navy search and rescue procedure interjected in the plot." Roger Ebert of the Chicago Sun-Times rated it 2/4 stars and wrote, "The movie's a big, slick entertainment, relentlessly ridiculous and therefore never boring for long." The New York Times wrote, "Airport '77 looks less like the work of a director and writers than like a corporate decision."

Box office
The film grossed $30 million in the United States and Canada and $61 million internationally for a worldwide total of $91 million.

Awards nominations

Theme Park attraction
From late 1977 until the early 1980s, the Universal Studios Tour in California featured the "Airport '77" Screen Test Theater as part of the tour. Several sets were recreated, and members of the audience were chosen to play various parts. The audience would watch as these scenes were filmed. Key scenes such as the hijacking, crash and rescue were recreated, and the footage was then incorporated into a brief digest version of the film and screened for the audience on monitors. Each show's mini-film was made available to audience members to purchase on 8mm and videotape.

References

External links

 
 
 
 

1977 films
1970s thriller films
1970s disaster films
Airport (film series)
American aviation films
American disaster films
1970s English-language films
Films about aviation accidents or incidents
Films about aircraft hijackings
Films set on airplanes
Films set in Miami
Films set in the Bermuda Triangle
Universal Pictures films
American sequel films
Films based on works by Arthur Hailey
Films directed by Jerry Jameson
1970s American films